Gubernatorial elections were held in the Democratic Republic of the Congo on 27 January 2007 (with 30 January planned as a possible date for a second round, if necessary), though they were originally scheduled for 16 January and 19 January. The governors and vice-governors were chosen through indirect election by the members of the provincial assemblies; the delay was a result of the difficulties in choosing traditional chiefs to fill the places reserved for them in the provincial assemblies. The second round of voting would only have been necessary in those cases where no candidate had received an absolute majority in the first round, which was not the case anywhere. However, voting was rescheduled in Kasai-Occidental and Kasai-Oriental on 10 February to 15 February, because the Union of the Nation candidates were disqualified because they held dual citizenship.

Elections were held only for the current eleven provinces of the Democratic Republic of the Congo; once the reorganisation into twenty-six provinces has been passed into law in 2009, elections would be held for the fifteen new gubernatorial and vice-gubernatorial posts.

Governors elected

Both of the independents and the RCD governor are allied with Kabila, which means that the opposition managed to attain the post of governor in only one province.

Protests in Bas-Congo
In the province of Bas-Congo, the pro-government independent candidate, Simon Mbatshi, won 15 votes against the opposition MLC candidate, Fuka Unzola, who obtained 14 votes. Opposition activists held protests alleging vote-buying and chanting "Congo can't be rebuilt on corruption". Clashes between the police and Bundu dia Kongo, an opposition secessionist religious group, lead to 134 deaths. The results were annulled on 8 February by an appeals court, but its findings were then overturned by the Constitutional Court of the Democratic Republic of the Congo on 17 February 2007.

See also
List of Provincial Governors of the Democratic Republic of the Congo

References

Congo, Democratic Republic of the Gubernatorial
Gubernatorial elections
2007 Gubernatorial
January 2007 events in Africa